EIC may refer to:

Companies and organizations
East India Company, a major British company that once controlled major parts of the Indian subcontinent
East India Club
 East India Comedy, an Indian comedy group
 Edison Illuminating Company
 Emmanuel International Canada, a non-profit, evangelical Christian relief organization
 Encompass Insurance Company, of New Jersey
 Energy in Common, an American renewable energy organization
 Engineering Institute of Canada
 Ensemble InterContemporain, an orchestra
 Entertainment Industries Council, an American public health organization
 Environmental Information Coalition, creators of the Encyclopedia of Earth
 Estonian Iraqi Contingent
 European Innovation Council, introduced by the European Commission to support the commercialization of high-risk, high-impact ideas 
 European International Contractors, association, affiliated by its members of European international contractors, dealing with all questions arising from international construction
 European Investigative Collaborations, a journalism organization

Schools
 Ealing Independent College, in West London
 Edinburgh International College, in Scotland
 Cherbourg School of Engineering, in France
 International School of Carthage, in Tunis, Tunisia

Other
 Education in Chemistry, a magazine
 Earned Income Credit, in the United States
 East Iceland Current
 Eastern Indiana Conference, in northeastern Indiana from 1953 to 1975
 Eastern Intercollegiate Conference, a defunct NCAA conference
 Editor-in-chief
 Electron–ion collider, a proposed type of particle accelerator collider
 Electronic identity card
 Employer Identification Number, assigned by the United States Internal Revenue Service
 Energy Identification Code, to identify gas and electricity assets, actors, and jurisdictions in Europe
 Excellence in Cities, a British government program
 Exercise-induced collapse, a genetic syndrome in dogs
 Extracted-ion chromatogram, a representation of data in hyphenated mass spectrometry/chromatography

See also
 East India Company (disambiguation)